Anneke van Dok-van Weele (born 24 October 1947, Zaandam) is a Dutch politician.

References

1947 births
Living people
Women mayors of places in the Netherlands
Labour Party (Netherlands) politicians
Mayors in North Holland
Mayors in Zeeland
Members of the House of Representatives (Netherlands)
People from Zaanstad
State Secretaries for Economic Affairs of the Netherlands
People from Velsen